"No Angel" is a song by English musician Birdy.  The song was released as a digital download on 18 September 2013 in the United Kingdom, as the second single from her second studio album, Fire Within (2013). The song was written by Birdy and Ben Lovett and produced by Jim Abbiss. The song has charted in France and the Netherlands.

Track listing

Charts

Release history

References

2013 singles
Birdy (singer) songs
2013 songs
Songs written by Ben Lovett (British musician)
Song recordings produced by Jim Abbiss
Warner Music Group singles
2010s ballads